Mr. President was a German Eurodance project best known for the crossover world hit "Coco Jamboo" released in 1996. The group is also famous in Europe for the dance hits "Up'n Away", "I'll Follow the Sun", "I Give You My Heart", "4 on the Floor", "Jojo Action" and the hit albums Up'n Away – The Album and We See the Same Sun.

Mr. President was originally formed in 1991 in Bremen, Germany, by producers Jens Neumann and Kai Matthiesen. In the beginning, the group consisted of the German singers Judith Hinkelmann (T-Seven), Daniela Haak (Lady Danii) and American rapper George Jones (Sir Prophet). In 1994, Jones was replaced by British rapper Delroy Rennalls (Layzee Dee). When Hinklemann departed the act in 2000 to begin a solo career,  singer Nadia Ayche joined the group as her replacement. Ayche, however, was quickly replaced by singer Myra Beckmann in 2001. When Beckmann also departed the act in 2003, singer Franziska Frank (Franzi) joined the act. By 2008, Mr. President had officially disbanded.

Since 2008, Rennalls has continued to tour across Europe as LayZee formerly of Mr. President in addition to releasing his own solo material. In 2014, he recruited Hungarian-born singer Erika Kovács into his live act. Today, Rennalls and Kovács perform the Mr. President hits as a live duo act worldwide.

History

Group Origins (1991)
In 1991, German DJs, Jens Neumann and Kai Matthiesen, formed a live rapper-singer duo act called Satellite One consisting of American rapper George Jones and German singer Daniela Haak. When Neumann hired German singer Judith Hinkelmann into the act, Satellite One officially became a trio act. Each of the band members soon adopted stage names. Hinkelmann became "T-Seven" while Jones and Haak became known as "Sir Prophet" and "Lady Danii".

After a few years of performing in clubs without any mainstream success, Neumann and Matthiesen, now managers as well as producers, decided to change the name of the band to Mr. President, Under the new band name, the group created an underground dance club hit with the song "MM" an acronym meaning (Marilyn Monroe) in 1993.

Success with "Up n' Away" (1995)
Following the success of their under underground hit, Mr. President released the hit Up'n Away. In mid-1994, Neumann replaced Jones with British rapper Delroy Rennalls (Layzee Dee). The first full-length Mr.President album, Up'n Away – The Album was released in 1995 featuring a new version of Up N' Away with Rennalls rap vocals. The album also featured the hit single "I'll Follow the Sun".

Mainstream success with "Coco Jamboo" (1996)
In 1996, Neumann and Matthiesen decided to embrace a radically different sound for the next Mr. President single. The reggae-fusion inspired hit "Coco Jamboo" quickly became a crossover hit worldwide. It was the first Mr. President single to chart in the UK peaking at No. 8 and in the United States, peaking at No. 21 on the Billboard Hot 100. Coco Jambo was featured on the album We See the Same Sun along with the hit singles "I Give You My Heart" and "Show Me the Way".

Nightclub and Space Gate (1997–1999) 
Hoping to capitalize on the success of We See the Same Sun, Mr. President again employed their lighter sound on the 1997 CD Night Club. Jojo Action, the first single released from Nightclub added to the band's continued success in Europe, peaking as high as #3 in Austria. Although the next three hits from the CD charted impressively in Europe, none of the singles were able to chart in the United States. During the promotional campaign for Night Club in 1997, Lady Danii took a brief leave from the group to pursue a solo career with the band Reset, but returned a few months later.

In the midst of promotion, Haak, Hinkelmann and Rennalls were accused of not using their own voices in any of Mr. President's songs. Hamburg's leading and well-known magazine Stern reported the whole scandal that was first revealed on German Radio station Bremen 4. According to their report, the actual voices belonged to Caren Miller, Anne Schroeder, and William King III. However, Matthiesen and Neumann appeared in a televised interview on German channel VIVA and explained that the voices were indeed Daniela and Judith's, but that their pitches were technically edited during recording.

A year later, Mr. President released Space Gate, which marked a return to their earlier sound. "Give a Little Love" and "Simbaleo" proved to be moderate successes, but the band was again unable to return to the heights of 1996.

Compilation album and hiatus (2000)
After half a year away from the studio in 1999, Mr. President returned in the new millennium with A Kind of... Best!, their first singles compilation CD. Accompanying the CD was Up N' Away 2k, the band's new single, which failed to chart even in Germany. Following the failure of their latest single and their fading public image, Judith Hinkelmann left the group in February 2000 to begin her solo career. Following the departure of Hinkelmann, the band decided to focus efforts on releasing another compilation album, and they did, with Golden Super Hits hitting shelves near the end of 2000.

Lineup changes, and Forever & One Day album (2001–2004)
Mr. President reemerged in early 2001 after hiring classical singer Nadia Ayche. Although the band performed live with Ayche, and even began recording new songs with her, she was dismissed in 2002 after directional disagreements with the band. Ayche's replacement, Myra Beckmann, was hired soon after, and the new lineup began immediately recording songs for their next CD.

After almost a year in the studio, Forever & One Day was released in the summer of 2003 with Love, Sex and Sunshine as the lead single. After almost four years away from the European music scene, the band's latest single managed to chart impressively well, peaking at number 23 in Germany. The following single, Forever & One Day, was released a few weeks later and did similarly well, peaking at number 51 in their homeland. Just a few months after touring had begun, however, Beckmann was forced to leave the band due to undisclosed health issues, leaving Haak and Rennalls to perform as a duo for the remainder of the tour. Once again, the band was forced to find someone to fill the vacated lead vocalist position, and a few weeks later, they did, hiring established pop singer Franziska "Franzi" Frank.

Final singles and breakup (2005–2008)
Immediately following the Forever & One Day tour, the band announced its intentions to create a new CD. Despite the announcement, nothing ever materialized. The band would go on performing at special events (most notably at Hit Giganten in 2004) until 2006. In 2005, the first (and only) single featuring Frank's vocals, "Sweat (A La La La La Long)", a cover of the Inner Circle hit, was released as an iTunes-only single. Another iTunes-only single was released by the band in 2006. This single, titled "Megamix 2006", blended each of the band's greatest hits into a single track. Following the release of "Megamix 2006", the band quietly went into hiatus (although they performed a handful of times in 2007 and 2008), with word of official separation coming in 2008, when Lazy, Frank, and Haak announced that they would be parting ways. Since then, no plans for reuniting the band have been made, however, Lazy still performs at various '90s revival shows with various female vocalists performing all of the Mr. President songs. T-Seven has her own solo discography, and is currently performing in a tour of '90s nostalgia performances called "90s Unplugged". All of the other former members of Mr. President have seemingly retired from the music business entirely.

LayZee formerly of Mr. President (2008–present)

Since 2008, Rennalls has continued to tour across Europe and South America as LayZee formerly of Mr. President. In 2014, he recruited Hungarian-born singer Erika Kovács to be the singer in his live act. Today, Rennalls and Kovács continue to perform the Mr. President hits as a duo act at concert venues worldwide. Rennalls has also continued to release his own solo music while doing collaborations with other artists and running his own independent label, DieZel Records. To date, he has released a total of 7 solo singles including "Tonight", " Summertime", "Copacabana", "Come On Everybody" and "Calling in Sick".

In the years since the breakup of Mr. President, it has been confirmed that Caren Miller, Anne Schroeder, and William King III were indeed the actual vocalists on Mr. President's records from 1994-1999. Miller provided vocals for T-Seven (Judith Hinkelmann), Schroeder provided vocals for Lady Danii (Daniela Haak), and William King III provided vocals for Layzee (Delroy Rennalls) including the 2003 album Forever and One Day, though Rennalls did perform all of the rap vocals himself.

Band line-up
 Lady Danii (Daniela Haak; 1991–2008)
 T-Seven (Judith Hinkelmann; 1991–2000)
 Sir Prophet (George Jones; 1991–1994)
 Lazy Dee (Delroy Rennalls; 1994–2008)
 Nadia Ayche (2001–2002)
 Myra (Myriam Beckmann; 2002–2003)
 Franzi (Franziska Frank; 2003–2008)
 Caren Miller (1994-1999) (ghost singer for T-Seven)
 Anne Schroeder (1994-1999) (ghost singer for Lady Danii)
 William King III (1995-2003) (ghost singer for Lazy Dee)

Timeline

Discography

Studio albums

Compilation albums

Singles

References

External links
 Mr. President webpage
 Mr. President at MySpace
 Mr. President at Euro Dance Hits.com

German house music groups
German electronic music groups
German dance music groups
German Eurodance groups
Musical groups established in 1991
Musical groups disestablished in 2008
1991 establishments in Germany